Venkata Raju Palem is a village in Maddipadu mandal, Prakasam district, Andhara Pradesh state in India.

Geography 
Venkata raju palem is located at 15.5° N 80.05° E. It has an average elevation of 10 metres (32 feet).

Demographics 
As of 2001 India census, Venkata raju palem had a population of 589. Males constitute 51% of the population and females 49%. Venkata raju palem has a sound literacy rate of 99%, higher than the national average of 59.5%: male literacy is 100%, and female literacy is 99%. In Venkata raju palem, 15% of the population is under 6 years of age.

References 

Villages in Prakasam district